Ensenada Barrio is a barrio in the municipality of Guánica, Puerto Rico. Its population in 2010 was 1,705.

History
During the height of sugar production in Puerto Rico, Ensenada's economy was based on its sugar mill and processing plant. During this prosperous time of sugar production in Ensenada, the community sought to become its own town, separate from Guánica but once the sugar mill closed in 1982 resolved to remain part of the Guánica municipality.

A historic inn, the  Guánica, which was built in 1929, is located in Ensenada and withstood the 2019–20 Puerto Rico earthquakes, serving as a refuge for personnel from the Federal Emergency Management Agency.

Gallery

See also

 List of communities in Puerto Rico

References

External links

Barrios of Guánica, Puerto Rico